Anthony Elliott (born 2 February 1981 in Stockton-on-Tees) is a rugby union footballer who plays on the wing for Bristol in the RFU Championship. He previously played for French Pro D2 side Bordeaux Bègles and Birmingham & Solihull R.F.C.
He was released from his Bordeaux Begles contract in 2010 and signed for Birmingham & Solihull R.F.C.

In 2010 he married Abi Bannatyne, daughter of entrepreneur and media personality Duncan Bannatyne. The wedding took place just outside Cannes and was featured on Dragon's Den – What Happened Next – Duncan Bannatyne, in September 2010.

He joined Bristol for the second time on Thursday 21 October.

References

External links 
Bristol Profile
England profile

1981 births
Living people
Birmingham & Solihull R.F.C. players
Bristol Bears players
English rugby union players
Rotherham Titans players
Rugby union players from Stockton-on-Tees
Rugby union wings